Sidney Ernest White (15 February 1899 – 1968) was an English professional footballer who played for Edmonton Ramblers and Tottenham Hotspur.

Football career 
White began his career at the local Non league team Edmonton Ramblers. The left half joined Tottenham Hotspur in 1923 and made a total of 22 appearances in all competitions for the Lilywhites between 1923 and 1926.

References 

1899 births
1968 deaths
Footballers from Tottenham
English footballers
English Football League players
Tottenham Hotspur F.C. players
Association football midfielders